The US Yachts US 18 is an American trailerable sailboat that was designed by G. William McVay and adapted by Bayliner as a day sailer and first built in 1980.

The US 18 is a Bayliner development of McVay's 1964 sailing dinghy design, the Mouette 19 and is similar to the Buccaneer 180.

Production
The design was built by US Yachts in the United States, starting in 1980, but it is now out of production.

Design
The US 18 is a recreational keelboat, built predominantly of fiberglass, with wood trim. It has a fractional sloop rig, a raked stem, a reverse transom, a transom-hung rudder controlled by a tiller and a retractable swing keel. It displaces  and has a small cuddy cabin.

See also
List of sailing boat types

References

External links

Keelboats
1980s sailboat type designs
Sailing yachts 
Trailer sailers
Sailboat type designs by G. William McVay
Sailboat types built by US Yachts